Al Maha Airways was a planned subsidiary airline of Qatar Airways to serve the Saudi Arabian aviation market based initially at King Abdulaziz International Airport in Jeddah, and then at Hamad International Airport in Doha. The start of operations was postponed several times following its announcement in 2014, and then cancelled entirely by February 2017 following issues obtaining its operational license. The Qatar diplomatic crisis, the suspension of flights to and from Qatar as well as the barring of Qatar-registered aircraft from Saudi Arabian, Bahraini, Emirati and Egyptian airspace sealed the fate of the airline.

History
Al Maha Airways was founded as a Saudi Arabian subsidiary of Qatar Airways in 2014, but never began operations. Al Maha, which means "oryx" in Arabic, was to sport the Qatar Airways logo but would be green instead of the Qatar Airways signature burgundy colour, to match Saudi Arabia's national colors. On 29 April 2015, Al Maha Airways took delivery of four Airbus A320-200 aircraft.

The airline was set to begin operations in the fourth quarter of 2014, but then the starting date was postponed to summer 2016. In February 2017, Qatar Airways announced however that the Al Maha Airways project was cancelled and the airline would not start operations, due to ongoing issues gaining its operational license.

2017 Qatar diplomatic crisis 
The added impact of the Qatar diplomatic crisis, and the Qatar Air Blockade which involved the 3 member countries barring Air routes from Qatar Airways and Qatar registered Aircraft and to not utilize the following Airspaces :-

Qatar Airways barred from using UAE Airspace in the UAE.
Qatar Airways barred from using Saudi Airspace in Saudi Arabia.
Qatar Airways barred from using Bahraini Airspace in Bahrain.
Qatar Airways barred from using Egyptian Airspace in Egypt

In turn, the airlines from the following countries suspended routes to Qatar.

Emirates, Etihad Airways, Flydubai and Air Arabia in the UAE.

Saudia in Saudi Arabia.

Gulf Air in Bahrain.

Egyptair in Egypt.

This all had proven too much for Al Maha Airways to proceed. Because of this, Qatar Airways' CEO Mr. Akbar Al Baker had announced that Al Maha Airways was abandoned and Al Maha Airways completely ceased operations in 2017. The 4 remaining Airbus A320s were repainted and went into service with Qatar Airways.

Destinations
The initial destinations were planned to be Jeddah, Riyadh, Dammam, Madina, Abha, Al Qassim, Doha, Dubai (Al Maktoum) and Muscat.

Fleet

As of November 2016 the Al Maha Airways fleet consisted of the following aircraft:

References

External links
List of airlines of Qatar

Defunct airlines of Qatar
Airlines established in 2014
Airlines disestablished in 2017
Qatar Airways
Qatari companies established in 2014
2014 disestablishments in Saudi Arabia